Artemius (Artemy) of Verkola (1532 - 23 June 1544) is a child saint venerated in the Russian Orthodox Church.

According to his hagiography, he was an unusually pious peasant child who lived in village Verkola in northern Russia. He was struck by lightning while helping his father plow the fields and was killed instantly. He was interred in a clearing and a wooden shell was placed around his body, with a fence constructed around it.

Thirty-three years after his death a local deacon saw a light emanating from the boy's resting place and supposedly discovered the boy's body showed no sign of decay. Miracles of healing happened to people who venerated the boy's relics and he was proclaimed a saint.

In 1648, by order of Tsar Alexis Mikhailovich of Russia was founded the St. Artemius of Verkola monastery, and relics of the saint was moved into it.

In 1918, the Bolsheviks destroyed his relics in Verkola, thus making him a martyr for the Orthodox Church.

Iconographer Philip Zimmerman of New Florence, PA received a waking vision of the child saint who asked him, "to paint what he saw. For the children at the Village."  After much discernment and 5 years of contemplation Mr. Zimmerman painted what he saw at the direction of Father John Namie of the Antiochian Village Camp located in Bolivar, PA. This icon is still enshrined within the camp precincts and is still venerated each year by the children attending this Antiochian Orthodox Christian Youth Camp. Many following visitations and revelations to Mr. Zimmerman by the saint have confirmed what he saw in his dream about the history and he hagiography of this 16th Century Wonder working child saint.

Notes

Russian Orthodox child saints
Russian saints of the Eastern Orthodox Church
1532 births
1544 deaths
Deaths from lightning strikes